Forever and Ever may refer to:

 "For ever and ever" or "unto the ages of ages" ("in saecula saeculorum"), a biblical phrase

Film and television
 Forever and Ever (film), a 1977 Hong Kong film directed by John Law
 Forever and Ever, a 2001 Hong Kong film directed by Raymond To
 Forever and Ever (TV series), a 2021 Chinese romantic drama series

Music

Albums
 Forever and Ever (David Choi album) or the title song, 2011
 Forever and Ever (Demis Roussos album) or the title song (see below), 1973
 Forever and Ever – 40 Greatest Hits, by Demis Roussos, 1998
 Forever and Ever – Definitive Collection, by Demis Roussos, 2002
 Forever and Ever (Dune album), 1998
 Forever and Ever (Howard Hewett album) or the title song, 1988
 Forever & Ever, by Sales, 2018

Songs
 "Forever and Ever" (Demis Roussos song), 1973
 "Forever and Ever" (Franz Winkler and Malia Rosa song), 1948
 "Forever and Ever" (Slik song), 1976
 "Forever and Ever", by Joe Satriani from What Happens Next, 2018

See also
 "Forever and Ever, Amen", a 1987 song by Randy Travis
 "Forever and Ever Amen", a 2010 song by the Drums from The Drums
 Forever + Ever x Infinity, a 2020 album by New Found Glory